Rock the Cradle is an MTV reality show in which the offspring of R&B, pop, and rock stars from the 1980s and 1990s vie in a six-week singing competition. The show debuted on April 3, 2008, and ended on May 8 of the same year.

Personnel 
The show was hosted by Ryan Devlin, and there was a panel of four judges composed of The Go-Go's lead vocalist Belinda Carlisle, choreographer Jamie King, celebrity fashion stylist June Ambrose, and entertainment attorney/personal manager Larry Rudolph, who was also one of the executive producers. Brian Friedman substituted for an absent King in the fourth week.

Scoring and elimination 
Judges rated performances each week, and the highest-scoring contestant earned immunity from elimination for the following week. Elimination was determined by popular vote via toll-free telephone calls and text messaging. No immunity was granted for week five's performances, so all three finalists were subject to the popular vote and elimination to determine the winner.

Contestants 
The following contestants were featured:

Results 
The following list is presented in the order in which the contestants performed.
{| class="wikitable" style="text-align:center"
|+ Weekly Results by Call-out
|-
!| Episode 1 || Episode 2 || Episode 3 || Episode 4 || Episode 5 || Episode 6
|-
|Landon26.5|| Lucy31.0|| style="background-color:yellow;"|Jesse S.37.5|| Jesse S.31.0|| Crosby38.0||style="background-color:cyan;"|Crosby
|-
|A'Keiba34.5||style="background-color:yellow;"|Jesse S.35.5||Crosby34.0||Lara26.0||Chloe32.0||style="background-color:pink;"|Jesse S.
|-
|Lara28.5||Lara31.5||Chloe36.0||Lucy37.5||Jesse S.39.0||style="background-color:pink;"|Chloe
|-
|Chloe25.5||A'Keiba30.5||Lara30.5||Chloe21.0|| style="background-color:pink;"|Lucy
|-
|Crosby33.5||Crosby32.5||Lil B.21.5||style="background-color:yellow;"|Crosby38.5|| style="background-color:pink;"|Lara
|-
|Jesse S.32.5||Landon.33.5||Landon14.0|| style="background-color:pink;"|Landon
|-
|Jesse M.30.5||Lil B.25.0||Lucy28.5|| style="background-color:pink;"|Lil B
|-
|Lil B.31.0||Chloe27.0|| style="background-color:pink;"|A'keiba
|-
|style="background-color:yellow;"|Lucy36.5|| style="background-color:pink;"|Jesse M.
|}
 The contestant earned immunity for next week's elimination.
 The contestant was eliminated.
 The contestant won the competition.
Bold: The contestant had the highest score for that week.Italics'': The contestant had the lowest score for that week.

Items 
Chloe Rose Lattanzi was the only contestant whose familial connection was her mother rather than her father.
Episode 2 introduced a fifth score screen representing the singer's total score, which was not present in Episode 1.
The show was conceived as an eight-week contest, but due to lower-than-expected ratings, an announcement in Episode 3 declared that subsequent episodes would have double eliminations, reducing the total number of broadcast shows to six.  The Finale was moved from Las Vegas, Nevada to Los Angeles.
After winning the immunity spot for Episode 2, Jesse Blaze Snider attempted to reject his second immunity on Episode 3.  Producers forced him to accept the untouchable chair, ejecting Crosby Loggins for his earlier performance.
A'Keiba Burrell-Hammer's parent is a rapper rather than a singer.

References

http://www.bizzyblondesentertainment.com – Show's Creators

External links

Official Website
IAmOnMTV.com's Rock the Cradle page
RockBandLounge.com: Backstage at Rock the Cradle

2000s American reality television series
2008 American television series debuts
2008 American television series endings
MTV original programming
Singing talent shows